Propebela is a genus of sea snails, marine gastropod mollusks in the family Mangeliidae.

Species
Species within the genus Propebela include:

 Propebela alaskensis (Dall, 1871)
 Propebela alitakensis (Dall, 1919)
 Propebela angulosa (G. O. Sars, 1878)
 Propebela arctica (Adams, 1855)
 Propebela areta (Bartsch, 1941)
 Propebela assimilis (Sars G. O., 1878)
 Propebela bergensis (Friele, 1886)
 Propebela bogdanovi Merkuljev, 2021
 Propebela cancellata (Mighels & Adams, 1842)
 Propebela cassis Bogdanov, 1989
 Propebela concinnula (A. E. Verrill, 1882)
 Propebela diomedea Bartsch, 1944
 Propebela eurybia (Bartsch, 1941)
 Propebela exarata (Møller, 1842)
 Propebela exquisita Bartsch, 1941
 Propebela fidicula (Gould, 1849)
 Propebela golikovi (Bogdanov, 1985)
 Propebela goryachevi Bogdanov, 1989
 Propebela harpularia (Couthouy, 1838)
 Propebela kyurokusimana (Nomura & Hatai, 1940)
 Propebela lateplicata (Strebel, 1905)
 Propebela luetkeana (Krause, 1885)
 Propebela margaritae (Bogdanov, 1985)
 Propebela marinae Bogdanov, 1989
 Propebela miona (Dall, 1919)
 Propebela mitrata (Dall, 1919)
 Propebela monterealis (Dall, 1919)
 Propebela nivea Okutani, 1968
 Propebela nobilis (Møller, 1842)
 Propebela pitysa (Dall, 1919)
 Propebela popovia (Dall, 1919)
 Propebela pribilova (Dall, 1919)
 Propebela profunda Castellanos & Landoni, 1993
 Propebela profundicola Bartsch, 1944
 Propebela rassina (Dall, 1919)
 Propebela rathbuni (Verrill, 1884)
 Propebela rufa (Montagu, 1803)
 Propebela rugulata (Reeve, 1846)
 Propebela scalaris (Møller, 1842)
 Propebela scalaroides (Sars G. O., 1878)
 Propebela siogamaensis (Nomura & Zinbo, 1940)
 Propebela smithi Bartsch, 1944
 Propebela spitzbergensis (Friele, 1886)
 Propebela subtrophonoidea (Okutani, 1964) 
 Propebela subvitrea (Verrill, 1884)
 Propebela svetlanae Bogdanov, 1989
 Propebela tayensis (Nomura, S. & K.N. Hatai, 1938)
 Propebela terpeniensis Bogdanov, 1989
 Propebela tersa (Bartsch, 1941)
 Propebela turricula (Montagu, 1803)
 Propebela variabilis Bogdanov, 1990
 Propebela verrilli Bogdanov, 1989

Synonymized species 
 Propebela abernethyi (Dell, 1956): synonym of Antiguraleus abernethyi Dell, 1956
 Propebela bigranulosa Okutani, 1964: synonym of Mioawateria bigranulosa (Okutani, 1964)
 Propebela delicata (Okutani, 1964): synonym of Curtitoma delicata (Okutani, 1964)
 Propebela fenestrata (Powell, 1942): synonym of Antiguraleus fenestratus Powell, 1942
 Propebela fusiformis (Dell, 1956): synonym of Antiguraleus fusiformis Dell, 1956
 Propebela gouldii: synonym of Propebela rugulata
 Propebela hinae Okutani, 1968: synonym of Curtitoma hinae (Okutani, 1968)
 Propebela infanda (Webster, 1906): synonym of Antiguraleus infandus (Webster, 1906)
 Propebela multistriata (Dell, 1956): synonym of Antiguraleus multistriatus Dell, 1956
 Propebela munda (Suter, 1909): synonym of Antiguraleus mundus (Suter, 1909)
 Propebela murrhea (Webster, 1906): synonym of Antiguraleus murrhea (Webster, 1906)
 Propebela otagoensis (Powell, 1942): synonym of Antiguraleus otagoensis Powell, 1942
 Propebela pedica (Powell, 1942): synonym of Antiguraleus pedicus Powell, 1942
 Propebela plicata Okutani, 1964: synonym of  Plicisyrinx plicata (Okutani, 1964)
 Propebela pulcherrima (Dell, 1956): synonym of Antiguraleus pulcherrimus Dell, 1956
 Propebela pygmaea (Verrill, 1882): synonym of Curtitoma ovalis (Friele, 1877)
 Propebela reticulata: synonym of Curtitoma trevelliana (Turton, 1834)
 Propebela rossiana (Powell, 1942): synonym of Antiguraleus rossianus Powell, 1942
 Propebela schneideri M. Yokoyama, 1922: synonym of Propebela assimilis  (Sars, 1878)
 Propebela subtruncata (Powell, 1942): synonym of Antiguraleus subtruncatus Powell, 1942
 Propebela subturgida (Verrill, 1884): synonym of Oenopota subturgida (A. E. Verrill, 1884) 
 Propebela ula (Watson, 1881): synonym of Asperdaphne ula (Watson, 1881)
 Propebela valentina P. Bartsch in A.N. Golikov & V.V. Gulbin, 1977: synonym of Oenopota valentina  A.N. Golikov & V.V. Gulbin, 1977
 Propebela venusta Okutani, 1964: synonym of Propebela exquisita Bartsch, 1941
 Propebela viridula sensu (Møller, 1842): synonym of Propebela arctica (Adams, 1855)
 Propebela viridula (Fabricius, 1780): synonym of Admete viridula (Fabricius, 1780)
 Propebela yokoyamai K. Oyama, 1973: synonym of Propebela assimilis (Sars, 1878)

References

 Bouchet P., Kantor Yu.I., Sysoev A. & Puillandre N. (2011) A new operational classification of the Conoidea. Journal of Molluscan Studies 77: 273-308.

External links
 P Bartsch. "The Nomenclatorial Status of Certain Northern Turritid Mollusks"; Proceedings of the biological Society of Washington 54, 1-14, 1941
  Iredale, T. (1918). Molluscan nomenclatural problems and solutions.- No. 1. Proceedings of the Malacological Society of London. 13(1-2): 28-40
  Bouchet P., Kantor Yu.I., Sysoev A. & Puillandre N. (2011) A new operational classification of the Conoidea. Journal of Molluscan Studies 77: 273-308
 
 Worldwide Mollusc Species Data Base: Mangeliidae